Giorgia Patten (born 12 December 1999) is an Australian representative, Olympic and national champion rower.  She is a national U23 and senior champion and has placed second at World U23 Championships.   She rowed in the Australian women's eight at the Tokyo 2020 Olympics.

Club and state rowing
Patten is a West Australian who took up rowing at school at Perth College. Her senior club rowing has been from the West Australian Rowing Club.

Her state representative debut for Western Australia came in the 2017 youth eight which contested the Bicentennial Cup at the Interstate Regatta within the Australian Rowing Championships. She again rowed in the West Australian youth eight in 2018. She made Western Australia's senior women's eight in 2019 and contested the Queen's Cup at the Interstate Regatta for WA in 2019,2021 and 2022. In 2021 she stroked the West Australian women's eight.

In 2019 she contested all three national sculling titles in the U23 age division in her campaign for selection for the U23 World Championships. She won the double-scull U23 national title with Harriet Hudson. In 2021 in a National Training Centre eight she won the open women's eight title at the Australian Championships.  That year she also contested the open women's pair and the women's coxless four titles.

International representative rowing
Patten made her Australian representative debut in the coxless pair with fellow West Australian Bronwyn Cox in 2018. They rowed to a sixth placing at the World Rowing Cup III in Lucerne and then took the pair to the 2018 World Rowing U23 Championships in Poznan and finished in fifth place.

In 2019 Patten teamed up with Harriet Hudson and Hudson came to Perth where they trained under Western Australian coach Rhett Ayliffe. They were selected to row Australia's double-scull at the U23 World Championships in Sarasota-Bradenton where they won a silver medal behind Greece.

By the time of national team selections for the delayed Tokyo Olympics, Patten had forced her way into the Australian women's eight, which had qualified for the Olympics on its 2019 international performances.  

At the Tokyo 2020 Olympics the Australian women's eight were placed third in their heat, fourth in the repechage and fifth in the Olympic A final.

Had they managed to maintain their time of 5:57:15 that they achieved in their repechage they would have beaten the winners, Canada, by nearly two seconds and won the gold medal.

In March 2022 Patten was selected in the women's sweep squad of the broader Australian training team to prepare for the 2022 international season and the 2022 World Rowing Championships.  She rowed in the six seat of the Australian women's eight at the World Rowing Cup II in Poznan to a third placing and at the WRC III in Lucerne to a gold medal. At the 2022 World Rowing Championships at Racize, Patten was in the six seat of the Australian women's eight. They made the A final and finished in fifth place

References

Australian female rowers
1998 births
Living people
Rowers at the 2020 Summer Olympics
Olympic rowers of Australia
21st-century Australian women